James Greig  may refer to:
 Sir James Greig (British politician) (1859–1934), British barrister and Liberal Party politician
 James Greig (banker) (1834–?), banker and member of the Legislative Council of Hong Kong
 James Greig (potter) (1936–1986), New Zealand potter